Alicia rhadina is a species of sea anemone in the family Aliciidae. It is found in the Southern Ocean.

References

External links

Aliciidae
Animals described in 1893